
Gmina Młynarze is a rural gmina (administrative district) in Maków County, Masovian Voivodeship, in east-central Poland. Its seat is the village of Młynarze, which lies approximately 23 kilometres (14 mi) north-east of Maków Mazowiecki and 85 km (52 mi) north-east of Warsaw.

Villages
Gmina Młynarze contains the villages and settlements of Długołęka Wielka, Długołęka-Koski, Gierwaty, Głażewo-Cholewy, Głażewo-Święszki, Kołaki, Młynarze, Modzele, Ochenki, Ogony, Rupin, Sadykierz, Sieluń, Strzemieczne-Hieronimy, Strzemieczne-Oleksy, Strzemieczne-Wiosny and Załęże-Ponikiewka.

Neighbouring gminas
Gmina Młynarze is bordered by the gminas of Czerwonka, Goworowo, Olszewo-Borki, Różan, Rzekuń and Sypniewo.

References

External links
Polish official population figures 2006

Mlynarze
Maków County